Neotiara nodulosa, common name : the nodulose mitre, is a species of sea snail, a marine gastropod mollusk in the family Mitridae, the miters or miter snails.

Description
The shell size varies between 15 mm and 50 mm.

Distribution
This species is distributed in the Caribbean Sea, the Gulf of Mexico and the Lesser Antilles; in the Atlantic Ocean from North Carolina, the Bermudas to Brazil.

References

 Rosenberg, G., F. Moretzsohn, and E. F. García. 2009. Gastropoda (Mollusca) of the Gulf of Mexico, Pp. 579–699 in Felder, D.L. and D.K. Camp (eds.), Gulf of Mexico–Origins, Waters, and Biota. Biodiversity. Texas A&M Press, College Station, Texas.

External links
 Gastropods.com : Mitra (Nebularia) nodulosa; accessed : 14 December 2010

Mitridae
Gastropods described in 1791